The Toronto Rock are a lacrosse team based in Toronto playing in the National Lacrosse League (NLL). The 2004 season was the 7th in franchise history and 6th as the Rock.

The Rock continued its dynasty on top of the NLL standings, finishing first in its division for the sixth straight year. The Rock lost to the Buffalo Bandits in the division final, failing in their attempt at three consecutive championships.

Regular season

Conference standings

Game log
Reference:

Playoffs

Game log
Reference:

Player stats

Runners (Top 10)

Note: GP = Games played; G = Goals; A = Assists; Pts = Points; LB = Loose Balls; PIM = Penalty Minutes

Goaltenders
Note: GP = Games played; MIN = Minutes; W = Wins; L = Losses; GA = Goals against; Sv% = Save percentage; GAA = Goals against average

Awards

Roster

See also
2004 NLL season

References

External links
 

Toronto
2004 in Toronto